Shurik (also Romanized as Shūrīk and Shoorik; also known as Shorik) is a village in Koreh Soni Rural District, in the Central District of Salmas County, West Azerbaijan Province, Iran. At the 2006 census, its population was 1,182, in 222 families.

References 

Populated places in Salmas County

Shorik is the name of 2 villages in Khoy city. one in north of khoy on  khoy-chaypara road. other in northwest of khoy on khoy-chaldoran road.